Cortenuova (also Cortenova;) is a town and comune in the province of Bergamo, Lombardy (northern Italy).

The battle of Cortenuova was fought here in 1237.

Cities and towns in Lombardy